A list of films produced in Italy in 1978 (see 1978 in film):

See also
1978 in Italian television

References

Footnotes

Sources

External links
Italian films of 1978 at the Internet Movie Database

1978
Films
Italian